
Tadeusz Jacek Woźniak (born 15 January 1960 in Kutno) is a Polish politician. He was first elected to Sejm on 25 September 2005, getting 5396 votes in 11 – Sieradz district as a candidate from the Law and Justice (PiS) list. On 4 November 2011 he, along with 15 other supporters of the dismissed PiS MEP Zbigniew Ziobro, left Law and Justice on ideological grounds to form a breakaway group, United Poland.

See also
 Members of Polish Sejm 2005-07
 Members of Polish Sejm 2007-11

References

External links
 Tadeusz Woźniak - parliamentary page - includes declarations of interest, voting record, and transcripts of speeches.

1960 births
Living people
People from Kutno
Members of the Polish Sejm 2005–2007
Members of the Polish Sejm 2007–2011
Members of the Polish Sejm 2011–2015
Members of the Polish Sejm 2015–2019
Members of the Polish Sejm 2019–2023
United Poland politicians
University of Warsaw alumni
University of Warmia and Mazury in Olsztyn alumni
Recipient of the Meritorious Activist of Culture badge